Puig Neulós is the highest mountain of Albera Range, an eastern prolongation of the Pyrenees in Catalonia, between France and Spain. It has an elevation of 1,256 metres above sea level.

There are some antennas on the summit and there is a paved road on the French side restricted to military use. The summit, as well as most of the southern side of the range is part of the Paratge Natural d'Interès Nacional de l'Albera natural reserve.

A man-made rock formation known as La Reyne de las Founs surrounds a water source coming out of the mountain. Built by 19th century shepherd Emmanuel Coste, known as Manel, it is inscribed with the quotation "les douaniers ici trouvent souvent ce qu'ils cherchent". Later, smugglers used pebble formations to codify messages about customs officials in the vicinity.

See also
Paratge Natural d'Interès Nacional de l'Albera
Mountains of Catalonia

References

External links
Requesens - Puig Neulós hiking route
Manel Figuera i Abadal, 50 ascensions fàcils pel Pirineu català, Valls, Cossetània, 2008

Mountains of Catalonia
Emblematic summits of Catalonia